Indian Springs may refer to:

Places in the United States
Indian Springs, California (disambiguation), multiple locations
Indian Springs, Florida, a community in Jacksonville
Indian Springs, Georgia, a census-designated place in Catoosa County
Indian Springs, Indiana, an unincorporated place in Martin County
Indian Springs, Maryland, an unincorporated community in western Washington County
Indian Springs, Nevada, a town in Clark County
Indian Springs, Ohio, an unincorporated place (formerly a city) in Butler County
Indian Springs, Texas, a census-designated place in Polk County
Indian Springs Metropark, a park in Oakland County, Michigan
Indian Springs Village, Alabama, a town in Shelby County

Institutions
Indian Springs Mall, also known as the Indian Springs Shopping Center, was an American enclosed mall in Kansas City, Kansas
Indian Springs Middle School, a middle school in Columbia City, Indiana
Indian Springs School, a boarding and day school in Indian Springs Village, Alabama

Other uses
Treaty of Indian Springs (1821) and Treaty of Indian Springs (1825), two treaties between the Creek Indians and the United States
Indian Springs State Park, a state park in Georgia at the site of the treaties
Indian Springs Park (Davenport, Iowa), a contributing property in the Village of East Davenport Historic District